The women's 10,000 metres event at the 2003 Summer Universiade was held on 25 August in Daegu, South Korea.

Results

References
Results

Athletics at the 2003 Summer Universiade
2003 in women's athletics
2003